Orville Lamplough  (13 March 1897 – 19 July 1968) was an  Australian rules footballer who played with St Kilda in the Victorian Football League (VFL).

He served with the Australian Flying Corps in the First World War, earning the Distinguished Flying Cross in 1919 Birthday Honours.

Notes

External links 

1897 births
1968 deaths
Australian rules footballers from Victoria (Australia)
St Kilda Football Club players
Recipients of the Distinguished Flying Cross (United Kingdom)
Australian World War I flying aces